This article details the results of the China national chess team.

Chess Olympiads

China has competed at the every Chess Olympiad since the 23rd edition in 1978.

World Team Chess Championships

Asian Team Chess Championships

Asian Chess Games

Overall statistics

Yearly statistics

Asian Indoor Games

Overall statistics

Yearly statistics

2007
In October 2007, China won the gold medal in the "classic chess mixed team" event of the 2nd Asian Indoor Games in Macau with 11 match points. India won the silver with 9 match points followed by Vietnam with 8 match points and 16.5 game points for the bronze.

World Youth Olympiads (U16)

2002
The Malaysian Chess Federation (MCF) organised the World Youth Olympiad (U16) which took place in Kuala Lumpur, Malaysia 20–28 August 2002. 2nd seeds China A took clear first on the back of an 85% score on board 1 by Wang Yue and an 80% score on board 2 by Zhao Jun. (Games in PGN.)

Final Standings
 1 2  China - A       2362 31   232.0
 2 1  Ukraine         2412 27   234.0
 3 7  Indonesia       2197 26.5 219.0
 4 4  India           2292 26   238.0
 5 11 Uzbekistan      2113 24   238.5
 6 3  Romania         2300 23   233.0
 7 6  Iran            2224 22.5 226.5
 8 8  Kazakhstan      2176 22   228.5
 9 17 Singapore - A   2022 21.5 213.0
10 10 Vietnam         2119 21   216.5
11 9  Malaysia - A    2162 21   211.0
12 14 Australia - A   2067 21   190.0
13 5  England         2225 20.5 233.0
14 15 Turkmenistan    2067 20.5 179.0
15 28 USA             2000 20   198.0
28 Teams

National team summit matches

2001

2002

2006

2007

FIDE World Cup

2000

2007

Other

2000

2001

2003

2004

2005

2006

2007

See also
Chinese Chess Championship
World Team Chess Championship

Sources
OlimpBase, the encyclopedia of team chess
The Week in Chess 
List of chess periodicals

Further reading
 - details many Olympiad games of the Chinese team

External links
Elo rating list of top 100 Chinese chess players
General rating Statistics for China
OlimpBase, Men's Chess Olympiads, China

Footnotes

Chess in China